Andrew Clark Donaldson (8 November 1886 – 14 June 1980) was a Scottish footballer who played as an inside left. His clubs included Motherwell, Airdrieonians (three spells, making 337 Scottish Football League and Scottish Cup appearances in total and scoring 95 goals), Celtic and Third Lanark.

Career
Donaldson's father died when he was an infant – his mother remarried and at the time of the 1891 census he was known as Andrew Colquhoun. Soon afterwards his mother also died and his stepfather moved away; he and his brothers reverted to their original surname and were raised by their maternal grandparents in Motherwell. He began his football career in the juniors at Ashfield, and in March 1906 scored twice for Scotland Juniors against Ireland in March 1906; he was also capped against England a few weeks later.

Donaldson played regularly in the top division of Scottish football for 14 seasons, but never won a major trophy nor took part in a final – however, Airdrie won the minor Lanarkshire Cup six times while he was with the club, and he is known to have been involved in the 1914 victory but likely to have played in most if not all of the other finals. In January 1915 he scored four goals for Airdrie in a 5–0 league victory over Rangers, albeit this was during World War I when the SFL continued but wartime commitments and restrictions often affected the matches.

He later worked as a trainer and scout at Motherwell, including during the club's most successful period in the early 1930s and then worked as a groundsman until he was 83.

References

1886 births
1980 deaths
Footballers from North Lanarkshire
Scottish footballers
Airdrieonians F.C. (1878) players
Ashfield F.C. players
Motherwell F.C. players
St Johnstone F.C. players
Celtic F.C. players
Dykehead F.C. players
Scottish Football League players
Scottish Junior Football Association players
Scotland junior international footballers
Association football inside forwards
Association football coaches
Motherwell F.C. non-playing staff